Shi Xiushi (born July 1942) is a Chinese politician who served as governor of Guizhou from 2001 to 2006.

He was a member of the Standing Committee of the 10th and 11th National People's Congress. He was a member of the 16th Central Committee of the Chinese Communist Party.

Biography
Shi was born in Shangqiu County (now Shangqiu), Henan, in July 1942. In 1959, he was accepted to Beijing University of Civil Engineering and Architecture, majoring in glass ceramic technology. After graduation in 1964, he was despatched to the Academy of Building Materials Science, where he worked for 16 years.

Shi joined the Chinese Communist Party (CCP) in November 1978. He was deputy director and engineer of the Building Materials Department of Heavy Industry Bureau of the State Economic Commission in November 1980, and held that office until June 1986, when he was appointed director of the Tourism Coordination Group Office of the State Council. In May 1988, he became deputy director of the Second Bureau of the Secretary General of the General Office of the State Council, rising to director in July 1993. He rose to deputy secretary-general of the State Council in August 1996.

He was appointed deputy party secretary of Guizhou in December 2000, concurrently holding the governor position since January 2001.

In June 2006, he took office as vice chairperson of the National People's Congress Financial and Economic Affairs Committee, and served until March 2013.

References

1942 births
Living people
People from Shangqiu
Beijing University of Civil Engineering and Architecture alumni
People's Republic of China politicians from Henan
Chinese Communist Party politicians from Henan
Members of the 16th Central Committee of the Chinese Communist Party
Members of the Standing Committee of the 10th National People's Congress
Members of the Standing Committee of the 11th National People's Congress